was one of the administrative divisions of Taiwan during the Japanese rule. The prefecture consisted of modern-day Hualien County.

Population

Administrative divisions

Cities and Districts
In 1945 (Shōwa 20), there were 1 city and 3 districts.

Towns and Villages
The districts are divided into towns (街) and villages (庄)

Karenkō Shrine 
Karenkō Shrine was a Shinto shrine located in Hualien City, Hualien County (formerly Karenkō city, in Taiwan during Japanese colonial rule. It was ranked as a Prefectural Shrine and was the central shrine in Karenkō Prefecture.

History 
The shrine was built on August 19, 1915 (Taishō 4). Prince Yoshihisa and the Three Kami Deities of Cultivation no Mikoto, Ōnamuchi no Mikoto, no Mikoto were enshrined. On March 2, 1921 the shrine was classified as a Prefectural Shrine.

After World War II, the shrine became a martyrs' shrine honoring Taiwan's heroes such as Tei Seikō, Liu Yongfu, and Qiu Fengjia. In 1981, the shrine was demolished to make way for the Hualien Martyrs' Shrine which was built in the Northern Palace Architecture style.

Reference

wikipedia contributors

See also
Political divisions of Taiwan (1895-1945)
Governor-General of Taiwan
Taiwan under Japanese rule
Administrative divisions of the Republic of China

Former prefectures of Japan in Taiwan